Cypress County is a municipal district in southeastern Alberta, Canada that surrounds the City of Medicine Hat and the Town of Redcliff. The municipality is part of Census Division 1, Alberta.  The first farm in the area was settled in 1890.

Geography 
The Cypress County landscape is dominated by a shortgrass prairie ecosystem. The land is flat to slightly rolling. The Cypress Hills
region features mixed grasslands, wetlands and montane habitats.
Major hydrological features include the South Saskatchewan and Milk rivers.
Extensive coulee systems have formed adjacent to major rivers resulting in badlands terrain.

Near Walsh, Alberta at  lies the Badlands Guardian. Here the landscape takes the form of a head wearing a feathered headdress. This unusual geographic feature is a result of natural erosion of the surrounding prairie.

Communities and localities 
The following urban municipalities are surrounded by Cypress County.
Cities
Medicine Hat
Towns
Redcliff
Villages
none
Summer villages
none

The following hamlets are located within Cypress County.
Hamlets
Desert Blume
Dunmore
Hilda
Irvine
Schuler
Seven Persons
Suffield
Veinerville
Walsh

The following localities are located within Cypress County.
Localities 

Agatha
Alderson (dissolved from village status on January 31, 1936)
Army Experimental Range
Bain
Bellcott
Bowell
Bowmanton
Bulls Head
Bullshead
Carlstadt
Cecil
Craigower
Cressday
Dennis
Eagle Butte
Elkwater
Fitzgerald
Fox
Illingworth
Improvement District No. 1

Jaydot
Lamoral
Larmour
Little Plume
Macson
McNeill
Onefour
Pashley
Pivot
Ralston
Ronalane
Rosebeg
Royal
Roytal
Stornham
Thelma
Tothill
Vale
Wild Horse
Wisdom
Woolchester

Climate 
Cypress County has a semiarid climate with cold, dry winters and warm to hot summers. The winter cold is occasionally tempered
by mild and dry chinook winds blowing from the west. Hot summer daytime temperatures are made tolerable by low humidity and rapid cooling in the evening
hours. Maximum precipitation typically occurs in late spring and early summer.

Demographics 

In the 2016 Census of Population conducted by Statistics Canada, Cypress County had a population of 7,662 living in 2,689 of its 3,222 total private dwellings, a  change from its 2011 population of 7,214.

Economy 
Agriculture and the oil and gas industry are the primary economic activities within the county. Agricultural sectors include ranching, wheat and oil seed crops, irrigated alfalfa and other specialty crops. Irrigation water is supplied by the St. Mary River Irrigation District (SMRID) and other smaller water co-operatives. Oil and gas production is extensive throughout the county. Natural gas is gathered through pipe networks and processed in gas production plants near Hilda.

Attractions 
Bullshead Reservoir - Camping, Fishing
Cavan Lake Municipal Recreation Area - Camping, Boating, Fishing
Cypress Hills Interprovincial Park - Camping, Boating, Fishing, Golfing, Swimming, Hiking, Rodeo, Winter Carnival, Skiing (Water, Downhill, Cross Country)
Desert Blume Golf Club - Golfing
Golden Sheaf Municipal Recreation Area - Boating, Fishing, Water Skiing, Camping
Irvine Prairie Memories Museum - Local Historical Displays
Michelle Reservoir - Camping, Fishing, Boating
Murray Lake Reservoir - Fishing
Reesor Lake - Camping, Fishing, Boating, Hiking
Sandy Point Municipal Recreation Area - Camping, Fishing, Boating
Spruce Coulee Reservoir - Camping, Fishing, Boating
Cypress County Welcome Centre - Cypress County

Government

Municipal 
Cypress County has a Municipal Council of 9 elected Councillors. Councillors are elected by the eligible electors (Cypress County residents) who vote for a candidate in their electoral ward. Municipal elections organized by Alberta Municipal Affairs are held on the 3rd Monday in October every four years. Each October, the Councillors elect the Reeve and Deputy Reeve.

The Cypress County Council (elected in October 2021) consists of:
Councillor Michelle McKenzie
Councillor Blaine Brost
Councillor Lloyd Want
Councillor Robin Kurpjuweit
Reeve Dan Hamilton
Councillor Dustin Vossler
Deputy Reeve Richard Oster
Councillor Shane Hok
Councillor Keith Ritz (elected in byelection February 2022)

Provincial 
Cypress County is served by the Provincial Electoral Division of Cypress-Medicine Hat and represented in the Alberta Legislature by Independent MLA Drew Barnes.

Federal 
Cypress County is served by the Federal Electoral Division of Medicine Hat—Cardston—Warner and represented in the House of Commons of Canada by Conservative MP Glen Motz.

Military 
Cypress County is home to Canadian Forces Base Suffield.
The base provides an extensive training area for both Canadian and British Armed Forces.
Defence Research and Development Canada facilities are located here as well.

Fire Services

Cypress County Fire Services serves the entirety of Cypress County, excluding the city of Medicine Hat. They are a municipal paid-on-call fire department with 140 firefighters who respond to a yearly average of 250 calls for service. They have 9 fire halls located in Dunmore, Elkwater, Hilda, Irvine, One Four, Schuler, Seven Persons, and Walsh.

Infrastructure

Transportation 
Highways
The Trans-Canada Highway (1), Crowsnest Highway (3) and
Highway 41 traverse Cypress County.
The Trans-Canada enters the eastern
part of the County near Walsh and travels west through 
Dunmore and on to
Medicine Hat. From Medicine Hat the highway travels in a north westerly
direction passing near Suffield and on to Calgary. Planning has begun to
upgrade The Trans Canada to true freeway status. The Crowsnest highway
enters the County near Seven Persons and travels in a north westerly direction to Medicine Hat. Highway 41 begins at the U.S. border (Port of Wild Horse)
and passes through the county in a northerly direction. Highway 41 intersects
the Trans Canada Highway near Dunmore and continues on in a northerly direction
until it exits the County near Sandy Point Recreational Area at the county's
most northerly limits.

Road network
Cypress County has developed and maintains an extensive road network within its
municipal jurisdiction. Paved, oiled and graveled roads total more than 2700 km in length.

Rail
The Canadian Pacific Railway Main Line traverses Cypress County.
The line enters the eastern part of the County near Walsh and travels west
through Dunmore and on to Medicine Hat. From Medicine Hat the line travels
in a north westerly direction passing near Suffield and on to Calgary.
A secondary line joins the main at Dunmore and travels in a south westerly
direction passing near Seven Persons
and on to Lethbridge. Major switching yards are located in Dunmore. Several spur lines and side yards exist along the lines route to facilitate the handling of grain and other commodities.

Municipal services 
Cypress County provides municipal services through various departments. Services include agricultural programs, road maintenance, bylaw enforcement, land use planning, development advice and approvals, fire protection, recreation, street lighting, waste collection, recycling, water and sewer, emergency services, and family and community support.

Education

Secondary schools 
The Prairie Rose School Division #8 serves the needs of public school students.
Schools within this district include Eagle Butte High School, Burdett School, Bow Island Elementary, Senator Gershaw School, Parkside School, I. F. Cox School, Margaret Wooding School, Irvine School, Schuler School, Oyen Public School, New Brigden School, Ralston School, Seven Persons School, Beyond Walls Alternative Outreach School and
Elkwater Hutterite Colony and six other colony schools. The division office is located in Dunmore.

The Medicine Hat Catholic Separate Regional School Division #20 serves the needs of
Roman Catholic students. District schools located in Medicine Hat and Bow Island include
McCoy High School, St. Mary's School, Notre-Dame Academy, St. Louis School, St. Francis
Xavier School, St. Michael's School, Mother Teresa School and St. Patrick's School.
The division office is located in Medicine Hat.

Christian Education K-12 is provided by Cornerstone Christian School.

Post-secondary education 
The Medicine Hat College is a junior college located in Medicine Hat.
The college offers university transfer programs, applied degrees and apprenticeship
programs. Athletics include basketball, volleyball, and soccer.

See also 
List of communities in Alberta
List of municipal districts in Alberta

References

External links 

 
Municipal districts in Alberta
1985 establishments in Alberta
Populated places established in 1985